Lonaigbank and Marlyn is a pair of buildings in Luss, Argyll and Bute, Scotland. They are Category B listed, dating to the mid 19th century.

The buildings, single-storey cottages located on Pier Road, are made of whinstone and sandstone rubble with pink sandstone margins and dressings. Both possess timber diamond-paned casement windows. Each cottage has a pair of octagonal corniced chimney stacks with octagonal cans. It is a variant of the common form of cottage found elsewhere on the street.

The buildings are shown on the first-edition Ordnance Survey map, surveyed in 1860.

See also
List of listed buildings in Luss, Argyll and Bute

References

External links
View of the building – Google Street View, April 2011

19th-century establishments in Scotland
Listed buildings in Luss, Argyll and Bute
Category B listed buildings in Argyll and Bute